= NGC 7436 =

Galaxy pair in the constellation Pegasus

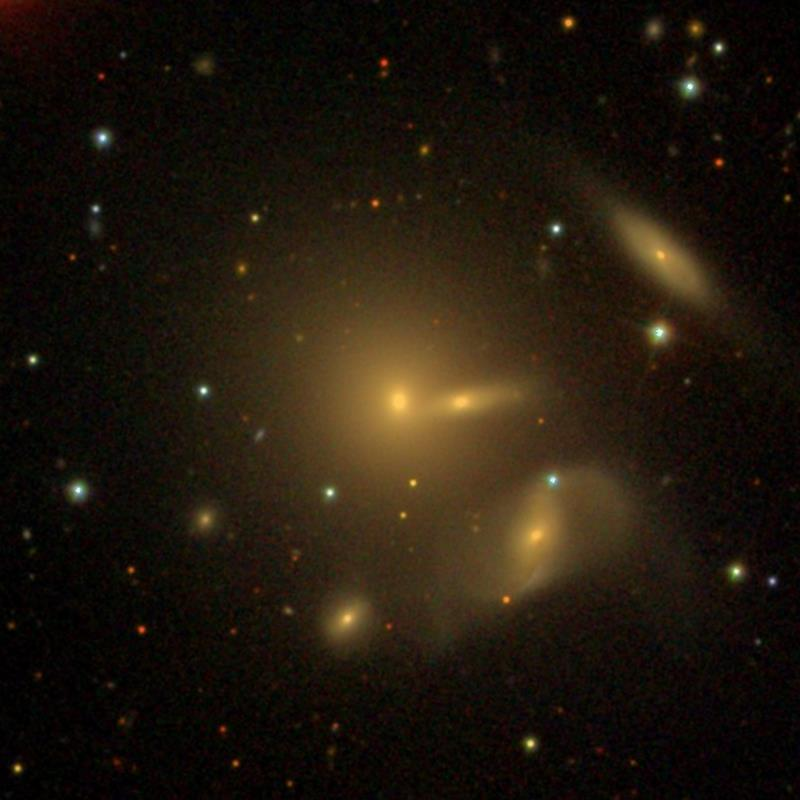
- SDSS image of NGC 7436

Observation data
- Constellation: Pegasus
- Right ascension: 22^{h} 59^{m} 12^{s}
- Declination: +26° 17′ 22″

NGC 7436 is a galaxy pair located in the constellation Pegasus. It was discovered on December 2, 1784 by the astronomer William Herschel.
